Football is the most popular sport in Serbia. The Football Association of Serbia (FSS) is the national governing body and is responsible for overseeing all aspects of the game of football in the country, both professional and amateur. The association organizes the professional Serbian Superliga (top tier) and is responsible for appointing the management of the men's, women's, and youth national football teams in Serbia. The association also organizes the Serbian First League (second) and Serbian League (third), operating the top 3 leagues.

The FSS is also responsible for organizing the Serbian Cup, the country's league cup competition. It has been played from the end of the 19th century and there were a number of very successful Serbian football players and coaches throughout history. 

One of Serbia's top football clubs Red Star Belgrade has won the prestigious European Champions Cup in 1991 and has also won the Intercontinental Cup the same year. Its local rival Partizan Belgrade was the first Southeast and Eastern European football club to reach the European Champions Cup final, when it did so in 1966. The most successful and popular teams are Red Star and Partizan from Belgrade as well as Vojvodina from Novi Sad. An important role also played OFK Belgrade and Radnički Niš in the history of the Serbian football

History

Kingdom of Serbia
Football first came to Serbia in the spring of 1896 when Jewish student Hugo Buli, after he returned from his studies in Germany, brought the first football from Berlin to Belgrade. He brought the ball to his friends from the Belgrade gymnastics society Soko, and founded the first football section in Southeast Europe on 12 May.

The inaugural meeting of the First Serbian Football Society (Prvo srpsko društvo za igranje loptom) took place on 1 May 1899, at the restaurant Trgovačka kafana, at initiative of Hugo Buli, and with support of Andra Nikolić, who was then Minister of Foreign Affairs in the Kingdom of Serbia. Feti Bey, the Turkish consul in Belgrade, was elected as President, and the lawyer Mihailo Živadinović as the Vice-President. In spring 1899, the first football field was built in the Topčider neighbourhood of Belgrade, and the first match was played in May that year between two teams of the members of the football society.

Most of the first Serbian football clubs were multi-sports societies which included football sections. The first football club was founded in Subotica  in 1898, the Szabadkai Sport Egylet (Sport Club Szabad), among the then fans better known simply as "Sport", within which was formed a football section in 1898 on the initiative of player and enthusiast Zoltán Wagner. Another club was founded in Subotica on May 3, 1901, the Sports Athletic Club Bačka. More than two years later, on 14 September 1903, the football club Šumadija was founded in Kragujevac. The Subotica clubs were older, but at the time of the foundation of Sport and Bačka, the city of Subotica was part of the Austro-Hungarian Empire, while Kragujevac was on the territory of the then kingdom of Serbia. Being still active, Bačka is the oldest club in nowadays Serbia. Just following the foundation of Šumadija, Soko was founded in Belgrade, and thus became the first football club from the capital city. Since then several other clubs were formed such as Srpski mač in 1906, BSK in 1911 and SK Velika Srbija (later renamed to SK Jugoslavija) in 1913.

In spring 1914, the Serbian Olympic Committee organised the first ever trophy to be played among the best football clubs of the Kingdom of Serbia. It was played in a single-round robin system, and in the final held in Belgrade it was won by Velika Srbija. This seemed to be a promising start of an organised football tournament to be held regularly, however later that same year the Austro-Hungarian Empire declared war against Serbia in what will be the beginning of the First World War and the halt of all recreational and sports activities in Serbia.

Kingdom of Yugoslavia
At the end of the First World War the boundaries in the region were changed and the Serbian state was part of the Kingdom of Serbs, Croats and Slovenes, later in 1929 renamed into Kingdom of Yugoslavia. The Yugoslav Football Association (Jugoslovenski nogometni savez) was founded at a meeting in Zagreb, on 18 April 1919. The founding assembly was presided Danilo Stojanović, popularly known as Čika Dača, important because he was the founder of several football clubs such as Šumadija, BSK and others.

In 1919 the Belgrade Football Subassociation formed the first league tournament that started being held regularly since its inaugural season in 1919–20. The first Yugoslav state championship was launched in 1923. The championships were played until 1940, and in this period the best Serbian clubs won seven state championship titles: BSK five and SK Jugoslavija two. The interruption of the championship occurred due to disagreements between the sub-associations, which culminated in 1929 when the YFA Assembly was dissolved. The differences were resolved in February 1930, after three months of crisis. An extraordinary Assembly was convened, and it took place in Zagreb on 16 May 1930. It was voted that the association's headquarters be moved to the state capital, Belgrade, and that the name of the association would be changed into Yugoslav Football Association (Fudbalski savez Jugoslavije). BSK, along with HŠK Građanski, dominated the state scene until the beginning of World War II.

This period was marked by the mass popularization of football. The national league was dominated by clubs from Belgrade and Zagreb, but within Belgrade major rivalry was created between BSK and Jugoslavija (Reds and Blues respectively) creating what will be the Eternal derby of that period. The rivalry expanded throughout the country, more intensely in Serb populated areas but in others as well, dividing citizens between Reds and Blues. Best league players became real media stars, and some became real heartbreakers among the female population, as was Bane Sekulić.

The year of 1935 marked the professionalization of football in Yugoslavia, with the replacement of amateur status to the professional one, and the introduction of contracts for players.

On the assembly of the Yugoslav Football Association held on October 1, 1939, a decision was made to rename the FA into Serbian Football Association, after earlier that year the FA's of Croatia and Slovenia were formed, and the delegates of Ljubljana, Osijek, Split and Zagreb subassociations decided to abandon the Yugoslav Football Association.

Socialist Yugoslavia
The end of the war was the beginning of the reconstruction, and the devastated football grounds and stadiums, as well as the football clubs needed to be restored. On 25 February 1945, the football club Metalac was founded, later its name was changed into BSK, and then into OFK Beograd, as successor to the tradition of the pre-war Beogradski Sport Klub (BSK). The Red Star Belgrade was formed on 4 March 1945, and Partizan Belgrade on 4 October of the same year. Some clubs were disbanded by the new socialist authorities, many on the ideological basis, for being considered too cosmopolitan and representative of the abolished monarchy, such as Jugoslavija or Jedinstvo Beograd, and some had simply disappeared due to man loss and long inactivity during the war. Some clubs were initially disbanded but shortly after, restored, the BASK case being the most evident, while a few top league clubs had continued their activity, as Vojvodina Novi Sad, RFK Novi Sad, Mačva Šabac and Radnički Kragujevac.

Contemporary period
After the dissolution of Yugoslavia, and the separation of Montenegro, on 26 June 2006, the Football Association of Serbia was admitted to the membership of FIFA and UEFA, as legal successor to all the previous national associations whose part it was. By this the world and European federations have acknowledged the continuity of football in the territory of Serbia, and the decisive role of Serbia in creating the history of the game in Western Balkans since the end of the 19th century. In recent years, many top Serbian players such as Dejan Stanković, Nemanja Vidić and Branislav Ivanović have gone on to forge successful careers in top European leagues. The U-21 team were runners-up at the 2007 UEFA Under-21 Championship having lost to the Netherlands in the final. As well, Serbia won the U-20 World Cup in 2015 in New Zealand.

Competitions

The governing body of football in Serbia is the Football Association of Serbia. It oversees the organization of:

 Leagues:
 Serbian SuperLiga — first league
 Serbian First League — second league
 Serbian League (4 groups) — third league
 Serbian League Belgrade
 Serbian League East
 Serbian League Vojvodina
 Serbian League West
 Serbian Zone League (10 groups) — fourth league
 Belgrade Zone League
 Banat Zone League
 Bačka Zone League
 Novi Sad-Syrmia Zone League
 Drina Zone League
 Dunav Zone league
 Morava Zone League
 Zone League East
 Zone League South
 Zone League West
 Serbian District League (31 leagues) — fifth league
 Serbian Intermunicipal League (52 leagues) — sixth league
 Serbian Municipal League (57 leagues) — seventh league
 Serbian Municipal Second League (6 leagues) — eighth league
 Cup tournaments:
 Serbian Cup
 National teams:
 Serbia national football team
 Serbia national under-21 football team
 Serbia national under-19 football team
 Serbia national under-17 football team

Note: the aforementioned competitions are for men if not stated differently. Women's football exists but is much less developed or popular.

Teams

By far the two most popular clubs in the country are Partizan and Crvena zvezda, both from Belgrade.

Player of the Year
The Serbian Footballer of the Year award is an annual award given from the Football Association of Serbia to the best player of the year.

+20,000-capacity football stadiums in Serbia

References

External links
 History of Football in Serbia via the Serbian FA

 

lt:Serbijos futbolo sistema